Mayfadoun is a village in Nabatieh District in southern Lebanon.

History
In the 1596 tax records, it was named as a village, Mayfadun, in the Ottoman nahiya (subdistrict) of Sagif under the liwa' (district) of Safad, with a population of 11 households, all Muslim. The villagers paid a fixed tax-rate of 25 % on agricultural products, such as wheat, barley and olive trees; a total of 5,269 akçe.

References

Bibliography

External links
Mayfadoun, Localiban

Populated places in Nabatieh District